Perittia cinereipunctella is a moth in the family Elachistidae. It was described by Turati in 1930. It is found in Zimbabwe.

References

Moths described in 1930
Elachistidae
Moths of Africa